Line 2A, Hanoi Metro (Cát Linh–Hà Đông), also known as Cát Linh line, is an elevated mass transit railway line, and part of the Hanoi Metro network. It is the first rapid transit line to operate in Vietnam, and was opened for service on 6 November 2021.

The 12-station line starts at Cat Linh in Dong Da District, passes through Thuong Dinh in Thanh Xuân District and ends at Yen Nghia in Ha Dong District.

History 
Construction of the  line started in October 2011 and was initially scheduled to be completed by 2013. The completion has been delayed due to several hurdles including finalizing funding from the government of China. The original cost estimate of $552.86 million has also ballooned to more than $868 million. Most of the funding for the project is financed by preferential loans from the Export Import Bank of China. The rest of funding is from the Vietnamese government.

The line was constructed by China Railway Engineering Corporation. The bulk of the construction was completed by the fourth quarter of 2018. Operational tests were conducted at the end of 2018 and again in 2019. After delays, Line 2A eventually opened to the public on 6 November 2021.

Stations 
The stations are built and designed with the concept of station variety. Each station has a distinct color. For example, La Khe station has a light green theme. All stations have curvy roofs, suitable for the hot, humid and rainy climate of Vietnam and consistent with Southeast Asian architecture. The roofs are covered with light-absorbing, wind-protection and radiation-proof materials. Some stations, such as Cat Linh Station, are designed with modern and neighborhood-multifunctional styles.

Stations are equipped with facilities such as lifts, escalators, stairways, security cameras, wheelchair accessibility, automatic fare collection systems, and ventilation systems. Emergency exits are designed according to international standards to ensure maximum safety for passengers.

Rolling stock 

13 4-car trainsets will be supplied by CRRC, with the first train delivered in March 2017. Electricity is supplied via third rail, to ensure safety, stability and urban landscape. The train has a two-way cockpit and is convertible at both ends. One train has a maximum capacity of about 1,000 passengers, or approximately 6 passengers/m2.

A modern automated signalling system (CBTC) ensures safety by governing the speed of the trains, and shortens train intervals.

Depot 

The depot contains an Operation Control Center (OCC), train stabling and maintenance areas, an operational building, a training area and a storage room.

The OCC operates round the clock, and is responsible for monitoring, supervising and controlling the entire system, ensuring smooth operation and safety.

Connections 
Line 2A is designed to ensure connectivity with other lines in the future and bus stops along the line to allow the public flexibility in selecting a route and the appropriate modes of transportation.
 Along the line: connected with BRT 01 at Yen Nghia, Van Khe, La Khe and Cat Linh stations.
 Cat Linh station: linked with Line 3, Nhon - Hanoi section.
 Thuong Dinh station: linked with Line 2, Nam Thang Long - Thuong Dinh section.
 Yen Nghia station: connected with Yen Nghia bus station (in the southwest of the city).
 In the future, line 2A will be connected with line 4 (Lien Ha - Me Linh) and line 8 (Son Dong - Duong Xa).

See also 

 Transport in Vietnam
 Ho Chi Minh City Metro
 Megaproject

References

External links

Rapid transit in Vietnam
Hanoi Metro
Railway lines opened in 2021